Ezequiel Oscar Videla Greppi (born 15 January 1988), known as Ezequiel Videla, is an Argentine former footballer who played as a defensive midfielder.

External links
 Profile at Tenfield Digital 
 
 
 

1987 births
Living people
Sportspeople from Córdoba Province, Argentina
Argentine footballers
Argentine expatriate footballers
Montevideo Wanderers F.C. players
San Martín de San Juan footballers
Instituto footballers
Universidad de Chile footballers
Club Atlético Colón footballers
Racing Club de Avellaneda footballers
Club Guaraní players
Aldosivi footballers
Deportivo Maipú players
Uruguayan Primera División players
Primera Nacional players
Argentine Primera División players
Chilean Primera División players
Paraguayan Primera División players
Association football midfielders
Argentine expatriate sportspeople in Uruguay
Argentine expatriate sportspeople in Chile
Argentine expatriate sportspeople in Paraguay
Expatriate footballers in Uruguay
Expatriate footballers in Chile
Expatriate footballers in Paraguay